Nepra may refer to:

 Neper (mythology)
 National Electric Power Regulatory Authority of Pakistan
 an East Slavic goddess of the Dnieper River